Norman Frank Dixon MBE, Fellow of the British Psychological Society (1922–2013) was a British psychologist most noted for his 1976 book On the Psychology of Military Incompetence.

Career
During World War II, Dixon served as a lieutenant in the Corps of Royal Engineers in North West Europe and received the MBE.

After ten years' service, he began university studies in 1950 and earned a first-class degree in psychology, followed by Doctor of Philosophy and Doctor of Science degrees. His research into subliminal perception and preconscious processing was influential. He taught psychology at University College London, where he became professor emeritus on his retirement.

Honours
In 1974, Dixon was awarded the Carpenter Medal by the University of London for his doctoral thesis. The University of Lund awarded him an honorary doctorate.

Selected publications
Dixon, Norman F. (1971). Subliminal perception; the nature of a controversy. London: McGraw-Hill.
Dixon, Norman F. (1976). On the psychology of military incompetence. New York: Basic Books.
Dixon, Norman F. (1981). Preconscious processing. Chichester: Wiley
 Dixon, Norman F. (1987). Our Own Worst Enemy. Jonathan Cape.

See also
 Military incompetence

References

British psychologists
1922 births
2013 deaths
Members of the Order of the British Empire
Academics of University College London
British non-fiction writers
Psychology writers
British male writers
Male non-fiction writers